The 1956 United States Senate election in Arkansas took place on November 2, 1956. Incumbent Senator J. William Fulbright won a third term in office. Without a primary challenger to Fulbright, the election did not attract much attention, as the Democratic nomination was tantamount to victory in the South.

Fulbright defeated Republican Ben Henley in a landslide.

General election

Results

See also
1956 United States Senate elections

References 

1956
Arkansas
United States Senate